Elachista baltica is a moth of the family Elachistidae. It is found in Sweden, Finland, Poland.

The larvae feed on Festuca rubra arenaria. They mine the leaves of their host plant.

Taxonomy
The species was previously synonymised with Elachista freyerella, but was reinstated as a species by Baran & Buszko in 2005.

References

baltica
Moths described in 1891
Moths of Europe